Squabble Creek may refer to:

Squabble Creek (Kentucky)
Squabble Creek (Texas)